This list contains the placental mammals in the order Chiroptera. There are an estimated 1,300 species of bat.

Suborder Yinpterochiroptera

Superfamily Pteropodoidea

Genera and species of flying fox as according to Mammal Species of the World, unless otherwise noted.

Subfamily Cynopterinae
Genus Aethalops
Pygmy fruit bat (Aethalops alecto)
Borneo fruit bat (Aethalops aequalis)
Genus Alionycteris
Mindanao pygmy fruit bat (Alionycteris paucidentata)
Genus Balionycteris
Spotted-winged fruit bat (Balionycteris maculata)
Genus Chironax
Black-capped fruit bat (Chironax melanocephalus)
Genus Cynopterus
Lesser short-nosed fruit bat (Cynopterus brachyotis)
Horsfield's fruit bat (Cynopterus horsfieldii)
Peters's fruit bat (Cynopterus luzoniensis)
Minute fruit bat (Cynopterus minutus)
Nusatenggara short-nosed fruit bat (Cynopterus nusatenggara)
Greater short-nosed fruit bat (Cynopterus sphinx)
Indonesian short-nosed fruit bat (Cynopterus titthaecheilus)
Genus Dyacopterus
Brooks's dyak fruit bat (Dyacopterus brooksi)
Rickart's dyak fruit bat (Dyacopterus rickarti)
Dayak fruit bat (Dyacopterus spadiceus)
Genus Haplonycteris
Philippine pygmy fruit bat (Haplonycteris fischeri)
Genus Latidens
Salim Ali's fruit bat (Latidens salimalii)
Genus Megaerops
Tailless fruit bat (Megaerops ecaudatus)
Javan tailless fruit bat (Megaerops kusnotoi)
Ratanaworabhan's fruit bat (Megaerops niphanae)
White-collared fruit bat (Megaerops wetmorei)
Genus Otopteropus
Luzon fruit bat (Otopteropus cartilagonodus)
Genus Penthetor
Dusky fruit bat (Penthetor lucasi)
Genus Ptenochirus
Greater musky fruit bat (Ptenochirus jagori)
Lesser musky fruit bat (Ptenochirus minor)
Genus Sphaerias
Blanford's fruit bat (Sphaeria blanfordi)
Genus Thoopterus
Swift fruit bat (Thoopterus nigrescens)
Suhaniah fruit bat ((Thoopterus suhaniahae))
Subfamily Eidolinae
Genus Eidolon
Madagascan fruit bat (Eidolon dupreanum)
Straw-coloured fruit bat (Eidolon helvum)
Subfamily Harpyionycterinae
Genus Aproteles
Bulmer's fruit bat (Aproteles bulmerae)
Genus Boneia
Manado fruit bat (Boneia bidens)
Genus Dobsonia
Andersen's naked-backed fruit bat (Dobsonia anderseni)
Beaufort's naked-backed fruit bat (Dobsonia beauforti)
Negros naked-backed fruit bat (Dobsonia chapmani)
Halmahera naked-backed fruit bat (Dobsonia crenulata)
Biak naked-backed fruit bat (Dobsonia emersa)
Sulawesi naked-backed fruit bat (Dobsonia exoleta)
Solomon's naked-backed fruit bat (Dobsonia inermis)
Lesser naked-backed fruit bat (Dobsonia minor)
Moluccan naked-backed fruit bat (Dobsonia moluccensis)
Panniet naked-backed fruit bat (Dobsonia pannietensis)
Western naked-backed fruit bat (Dobsonia peronii)
New Britain naked-backed fruit bat (Dobsonia praedatrix)
Greenish naked-backed fruit bat (Dobsonia viridis)
Genus Harpyionycteris
Sulawesi harpy fruit bat (Harpyionycteris celebensis)
Harpy fruit bat (Harpyionycteris whiteheadi)
Subfamily Macroglossinae
Genus Macroglossus
Long-tongued nectar bat (Macroglossus minimus)
Long-tongued fruit bat (Macroglossus sobrinus)
Genus Notopteris
Long-tailed fruit bat (Notopteris macdonaldi)
New Caledonia blossom bat (Notopteris neocaledonica)
Genus Syconycteris
Common blossom bat (Syconycteris australis)
Halmahera blossom bat (Syconycteris carolinae)
Moss-forest blossom bat (Syconycteris hobbit)
Subfamily Nyctimeninae
Genus Nyctimene
Broad-striped tube-nosed fruit bat (Nyctimene aello)
Common tube-nosed fruit bat (Nyctimene albiventer)
Pallas's tube-nosed fruit bat (Nyctimene cephalotes)
Mountain tube-nosed fruit bat (Nyctimene certans)
Round-eared tube-nosed fruit bat (Nyctimene cyclotis)
Dragon tube-nosed fruit bat (Nyctimene draconilla)
Keast's tube-nosed fruit bat (Nyctimene keasti)
Island tube-nosed fruit bat (Nyctimene major)
Malaita tube-nosed fruit bat (Nyctimene malaitensis)
Demonic tube-nosed fruit bat (Nyctimene masalai)
Lesser tube-nosed fruit bat (Nyctimene minutus)
Philippine tube-nosed fruit bat (Nyctimene rabori)
Eastern tube-nosed bat (Nyctimene robinsoni)
Nendo tube-nosed fruit bat (Nyctimene sanctacrucis)
Umboi tube-nosed fruit bat (Nyctimene vizcaccia)
Genus Paranyctimene
Lesser tube-nosed fruit bat (Paranyctimene raptor)
Steadfast tube-nosed fruit bat (Paranyctimene tenax)
Subfamily Pteropodinae
Genus Acerodon
Sulawesi fruit bat (Acerodon celebensis)
Talaud fruit bat (Acerodon humilis)
Golden-capped fruit bat (Acerodon jubatus)
Palawan fruit bat (Acerodon leucotis)
Sunda fruit bat (Acerodon mackloti)
Genus Desmalopex
White-winged flying fox (Desmalopex leucopterus)
Small white-winged flying fox (Desmalopex microleucopterus)
Genus Melonycteris
Fardoulis' blossom bat (Melonycteris fardoulisi)
Black-bellied fruit bat (Melonycteris melanops)
Woodford's fruit bat (Melonycteris woodfordi)
Genus Mirimiri
Fijian monkey-faced bat (Mirimiri acrodonta)
Genus Neopteryx
Small-toothed fruit bat (Neopteryx frosti)
Genus Pteralopex
Bougainville monkey-faced bat (Pteralopex anceps)
Guadalcanal monkey-faced bat (Pteralopex atrata)
Greater monkey-faced bat (Pteralopex flanneryi)
Montane monkey-faced bat (Pteralopex pulchra)
New Georgian monkey-faced bat (Pteralopex taki)
Genus Pteropus
Admiralty flying fox (Pteropus admiralitatum)
Aldabra flying fox (Pteropus aldabrensis)
Black flying fox (Pteropus alecto)
Small Samoan flying fox (Pteropus allenorum)
Vanuatu flying fox (Pteropus anetianus)
Silvery flying fox (Pteropus argentatus)
Aru flying fox (Pteropus aruensis)
Dusky flying fox (Pteropus brunneus)
Ashy-headed flying fox (Pteropus caniceps)
Bismark masked flying fox (Pteropus capistratus)
Moluccan flying fox (Pteropus chrysoproctus)
Makira flying fox (Pteropus cognatus)
Spectacled flying fox (Pteropus conspicillatus)
Large Samoan flying fox (Pteropus coxi)
Ryukyu flying fox (Pteropus dasymallus)
Pteropus ennisae
Nicobar flying fox (Pteropus faunulus)
Banks flying fox (Pteropus fundatus)
Gilliard's flying fox (Pteropus gilliardorum)
Gray flying fox (Pteropus griseus)
Ontong Java flying fox (Pteropus howensis)
Small flying fox (Pteropus hypomelanus)
Andersen's flying fox (Pteropus intermedius)
Kei flying fox (Pteropus keyensis)
Livingstone's fruit bat (Pteropus livingstonii)
Lombok flying fox (Pteropus lombocensis)
Okinawa flying fox (Pteropus loochoensis)
Lyle's flying fox (Pteropus lylei)
Big-eared flying fox (Pteropus macrotis)
Lesser flying fox (Pteropus mahaganus)
Mariana fruit bat (Pteropus mariannus)
Indian flying fox (Pteropus medius)
Black-bearded flying fox (Pteropus melanopogon)
Black-eared flying fox (Pteropus melanotus)
Caroline flying fox (Pteropus molossinus)
Great flying fox (Pteropus neohibernicus)
Mauritian flying fox (Pteropus niger)
Temotu flying fox (Pteropus nitendiensis)
Ceram fruit bat (Pteropus ocularis)
Ornate flying fox (Pteropus ornatus)
Chuuk flying fox (Pteropus pelagicus)
Pelew flying fox (Pteropus pelewensis)
Masked flying fox (Pteropus personatus)
Large Palau flying fox (Pteropus pilosus)
Geelvink Bay flying fox (Pteropus pohlei)
Grey-headed flying fox (Pteropus poliocephalus)
Bonin flying fox (Pteropus pselaphon)
Little golden-mantled flying fox (Pteropus pumilus)
Solomons flying fox (Pteropus rayneri)
Rennell flying fox (Pteropus rennelli)
Rodrigues flying fox (Pteropus rodricensis)
Madagascan flying fox (Pteropus rufus)
Samoa flying fox (Pteropus samoensis)
Little red flying fox (Pteropus scapulatus)
Seychelles fruit bat (Pteropus seychellensis)
Philippine gray flying fox (Pteropus speciosus)
Small Mauritian flying fox (Pteropus subniger)
Temminck's flying fox (Pteropus temminckii)
Guam flying fox (Pteropus tokudae)
Insular flying fox (Pteropus tonganus)
Vanikoro flying fox (Pteropus tuberculatus)
Kosrae flying fox (Pteropus ualanus)
Large flying fox (Pteropus vampyrus)
New Caledonia flying fox (Pteropus vetulus)
Pemba flying fox (Pteropus voeltzkowi)
Dwarf flying fox (Pteropus woodfordi)
Yap flying fox (Pteropus yapensis)
Genus Styloctenium
Mindoro stripe-faced fruit bat (Styloctenium mindorensis)
Sulawesi stripe-faced fruit bat (Styloctenium wallacei)
Subfamily Rousettinae
Genus Casinycteris
Short-palated fruit bat (Casinycteris argynnis)
Campo-Ma’an fruit bat (Casinycteris campomaanensis)
Pohle's fruit bat (Casinycteris ophiodon)
Genus Epomophorus
Angolan epauletted fruit bat (Epomophorus angolensis)
Ansell's epauletted fruit bat (Epomophorus anselli)
Peters's epauletted fruit bat (Epomophorus crypturus)
Dobson's epauletted fruit bat (Epomophorus dobsonii)
Gambian epauletted fruit bat (Epomophorus gambianus)
Lesser Angolan epauletted fruit bat (Epomophorus grandis)
Ethiopian epauletted fruit bat (Epomophorus labiatus)
East African epauletted fruit bat (Epomophorus minimus)
Minor epauletted fruit bat (Epomophorus minor)
Wahlberg's epauletted fruit bat (Epomophorus wahlbergi)
Genus Epomops
Buettikofer's epauletted fruit bat (Epomops buettikoferi)
Franquet's epauletted fruit bat (Epomops franqueti)
Genus Eonycteris
Greater dawn bat (Eonycteris major)
Philippine dawn bat (Eonycteris robusta)
Lesser dawn bat (Eonycteris spelaea)
Genus Hypsignathus
Hammer-headed bat (Hypsignathus monstrosus)
Genus Megaloglossus
Azagnyi fruit bat (Megaloglossus azagny)
Woermann's bat (Megaloglossus woermanni)
Genus Micropteropus
Hayman's dwarf epauletted fruit bat (Micropteropus intermedius)
Peters's dwarf epauletted fruit bat (Micropteropus pusillus)
Genus Myonycteris
Angolan fruit bat (Myonycteris angolensis)
São Tomé collared fruit bat (Myonycteris brachycephala)
Myonycteris leptodon
East African little collared fruit bat (Myonycteris relicta)
Little collared fruit bat (Myonycteris torquata)
Genus Nanonycteris
Veldkamp's dwarf epauletted fruit bat (Nanonycteris veldkampii)
Genus Plerotes
D'Anchieta's fruit bat (Plerotes anchietae)
Genus Rousettus
Egyptian fruit bat (Rousettus aegyptiacus)
Geoffroy's rousette (Rousettus amplexicaudatus)
Sulawesi rousette (Rousettus celebensis)
Long-haired rousette (Rousettus lanosus)
Leschenault's rousette (Rousettus leschenaulti)
Linduan rousette (Rousettus linduensis)
Madagascan rousette (Rousettus madagascariensis)
Comoro rousette (Rousettus obliviosus)
Bare-backed rousette (Rousettus spinalatus)
Genus Scotonycteris
Scotonycteris bergmansi
Scotonycteris occidentalis
Zenker's fruit bat (Scotonycteris zenkeri)

Superfamily Rhinolophoidea

Craseonycteridae 
 
bumblebee bat
Genus Craseonycteris
Kitti's hog-nosed bat (Craseonycteris thonglongyai)

Rhinopomatidae 
 
Mouse-tailed bats
Genus Rhinopoma
Egyptian mouse-tailed bat (Rhinopoma cystops)
Yemeni mouse-tailed bat (Rhinopoma hadramauticum)
Lesser mouse-tailed bat (Rhinopoma hardwickei)
Macinnes's mouse-tailed bat (Rhinopoma macinnesi)
Greater mouse-tailed bat (Rhinopoma microphyllum)
Small mouse-tailed bat (Rhinopoma muscatellum)

Megadermatidae
false vampire bats
Genus Cardioderma
Heart-nosed bat (Cardioderma cor)
Genus Lavia
Yellow-winged bat (Lavia frons)
Genus Macroderma
Ghost bat (Macroderma gigas)
Genus Megaderma
Greater false vampire bat (Megaderma lyra)
Lesser false vampire bat (Megaderma spasma)

Rhinolophidae

horseshoe bats
Subfamily Rhinolophinae
Genus Rhinolophus
Acuminate horseshoe bat (Rhinolophus acuminatus)
Adam's horseshoe bat (Rhinolophus adami)
Intermediate horseshoe bat (Rhinolophus affinis)
Halcyon horseshoe bat (Rhinolophus alcyone)
Arcuate horseshoe bat (Rhinolophus arcuatus)
Lesser woolly horseshoe bat (Rhinolophus beddomei)
Poso horseshoe bat (Rhinolophus belligerator)
Blasius's horseshoe bat (Rhinolophus blasii)
Bokhara horseshoe bat (Rhinolophus bocharicus)
Bornean horseshoe bat (Rhinolophus borneensis)
Canut's horseshoe bat (Rhinolophus canuti)
Cape horseshoe bat (Rhinolophus capensis)
Sulawesi horseshoe bat (Rhinolophus celebensis)
Rhinolophus chaseni
Chiewkwee's horseshoe bat (Rhinolophus chiewkweeae)
Geoffroy's horseshoe bat (Rhinolophus clivosus)
Croslet horseshoe bat (Rhinolophus coelophyllus)
Andaman horseshoe bat (Rhinolophus cognatus)
Cohen's horseshoe bat (Rhinolophus cohenae)
Convex horseshoe bat (Rhinolophus convexus)
Little Japanese horseshoe bat (Rhinolophus cornutus)
Creagh's horseshoe bat (Rhinolophus creaghi)
Damara horseshoe bat (Rhinolophus damarensis)
Darling's horseshoe bat (Rhinolophus darlingi)
Decken's horseshoe bat (Rhinolophus deckenii)
Dent's horseshoe bat (Rhinolophus denti)
Eloquent horseshoe bat (Rhinolophus eloquens)
Mediterranean horseshoe bat (Rhinolophus euryale)
Broad-eared horseshoe bat (Rhinolophus euryotis)
Greater horseshoe bat (Rhinolophus ferrumequinum)
Formosan woolly horseshoe bat (Rhinolophus formosae)
Francis's woolly horseshoe bat (Rhinolophus francisi)
Rüppell's horseshoe bat (Rhinolophus fumigatus)
Guinean horseshoe bat (Rhinolophus guineensis)
Hildebrandt's horseshoe bat (Rhinolophus hildebrandti)
Hill's horseshoe bat (Rhinolophus hilli)
Upland horseshoe bat (Rhinolophus hillorum)
Lesser horseshoe bat (Rhinolophus hipposideros)
Horáček's horseshoe bat (Rhinolophus horaceki)
Rhinolophus huananus
Imaizumi's horseshoe bat (Rhinolophus imaizumii)
Rhinolophus indorouxii
Philippine forest horseshoe bat (Rhinolophus inops)
Kahuzi horseshoe bat (Rhinolophus kahuzi)
Insular horseshoe bat (Rhinolophus keyensis)
Lander's horseshoe bat (Rhinolophus landeri)
Northern woolly horseshoe bat (Rhinolophus lanosus?)
Blyth's horseshoe bat (Rhinolophus lepidus)
Selangor woolly horseshoe bat (Rhinolophus luctoides)
Woolly horseshoe bat (Rhinolophus luctus)
Mount Mabu horseshoe bat (Rhinolophus mabuensis)
Maclaud's horseshoe bat (Rhinolophus maclaudi)
Big-eared horseshoe bat (Rhinolophus macrotis)
Madura horseshoe bat (Rhinolophus madurensis)
Maendeleo horseshoe bat (Rhinolophus maendeleo)
Malayan horseshoe bat (Rhinolophus malayanus)
Marshall's horseshoe bat (Rhinolophus marshalli)
McIntyre's horseshoe bat (Rhinolophus mcintyrei)
Smaller horseshoe bat (Rhinolophus megaphyllus)
Mehely's horseshoe bat (Rhinolophus mehelyi)
Rhinolophus microglobosus
Mitred horseshoe bat (Rhinolophus mitratus)
Formosan lesser horseshoe bat (Rhinolophus monoceros)
Timorese horseshoe bat (Rhinolophus montanus)
Mountain horseshoe bat (Rhinolophus monticolus)
Malaysian woolly horseshoe bat (Rhinolophus morio)
Mozambican horseshoe bat (Rhinolophus mossambicus)
Neriad horseshoe bat (Rhinolophus nereis)
Osgood's horseshoe bat (Rhinolophus osgoodi)
Bourret's horseshoe bat (Rhinolophus paradoxolophus)
Pearson's horseshoe bat (Rhinolophus pearsonii)
Yaeyama little horseshoe bat (Rhinolophus perditus)
Large-eared horseshoe bat (Rhinolophus philippinensis)
Bornean woolly horseshoe bat (Rhinolophus proconsulis)
Least horseshoe bat (Rhinolophus pusillus)
Rhinolophus refulgens
King horseshoe bat (Rhinolophus rex)
Peninsular horseshoe bat (Rhinolophus robinsoni)
Rufous horseshoe bat (Rhinolophus rouxii)
Large rufous horseshoe bat (Rhinolophus rufus)
Ruwenzori horseshoe bat (Rhinolophus ruwenzorii)
Sakeji horseshoe bat (Rhinolophus sakejiensis)
Schnitzler's horseshoe bat (Rhinolophus schnitzleri)
Lesser woolly horseshoe bat (Rhinolophus sedulus)
Shamel's horseshoe bat (Rhinolophus shameli)
Shortridge's horseshoe bat (Rhinolophus shortridgei)
Thai horseshoe bat (Rhinolophus siamensis)
Forest horseshoe bat (Rhinolophus silvestris)
Bushveld horseshoe bat (Rhinolophus simulator)
Chinese rufous horseshoe bat (Rhinolophus sinicus)
Smithers's horseshoe bat (Rhinolophus smithersi)
Lesser brown horseshoe bat (Rhinolophus stheno)
Little Nepalese horseshoe bat (Rhinolophus subbadius)
Small rufous horseshoe bat (Rhinolophus subrufus)
Swinny's horseshoe bat (Rhinolophus swinnyi)
Sulawesi broad-eared horseshoe bat (Rhinolophus tatar)
Thailand horseshoe bat (Rhinolophus thailandensis)
Thomas's horseshoe bat (Rhinolophus thomasi)
Trefoil horseshoe bat (Rhinolophus trifoliatus)
Yellow-faced horseshoe bat (Rhinolophus virgo)
Willard's horseshoe bat (Rhinolophus willardi)
Southwestern China horseshoe bat (Rhinolophus xinanzhongguoensis)
Dobson's horseshoe bat (Rhinolophus yunanensis)
Ziama horseshoe bat (Rhinolophus ziama)

Hipposideridae
The Old World leaf-nosed bats
Genus Anthops
Flower-faced bat (Anthops ornatus)
Genus Asellia
Arabian trident bat (Asellia arabica)
Somalian trident bat (Asellia italosomalica)
Patrizi's trident leaf-nosed bat (Asellia patrizii)
Trident bat (Asellia tridens)
Genus Aselliscus
Dong Bac's trident bat (Aselliscus dongbacana)
Stoliczka's trident bat (Aselliscus stoliczkanus)
Temminck's trident bat (Aselliscus tricuspidatus)
Genus Cloeotis
Percival's trident bat (Cloeotis percivali)
Genus Coelops
East Asian tailless leaf-nosed bat (Coelops frithii)
Malayan tailless leaf-nosed bat (Coelops robinsoni)
Genus Doryrhina
Cyclops roundleaf bat (Doryrhina cyclops)
Genus Hipposideros
Aba roundleaf bat (Hipposideros abae)
Ha Long leaf-nosed bat (Hipposideros alongensis)
Great roundleaf bat (Hipposideros armiger)
Dusky leaf-nosed bat (Hipposideros ater)
Lesser bicolored leaf-nosed bat (Hipposideros atrox)
Benito roundleaf bat (Hipposideros beatus)
Bicolored roundleaf bat (Hipposideros bicolor)
Boeadi's roundleaf bat (Hipposideros boeadii)
Short-headed roundleaf bat (Hipposideros breviceps)
Sundevall's roundleaf bat (Hipposideros caffer)
Spurred roundleaf bat (Hipposideros calcaratus)
Greater roundleaf bat (Hipposideros camerunensis)
Fawn leaf-nosed bat (Hipposideros cervinus)
Ashy roundleaf bat (Hipposideros cineraceus)
Large Mindanao roundleaf bat (Hipposideros coronatus)
Telefomin roundleaf bat (Hipposideros corynophyllus)
Cox's roundleaf bat (Hipposideros coxi)
Timor roundleaf bat (Hipposideros crumeniferus)
Short-tailed roundleaf bat (Hipposideros curtus)
Makira roundleaf bat (Hipposideros demissus)
Diadem roundleaf bat (Hipposideros diadema)
Fierce roundleaf bat (Hipposideros dinops)
Borneo roundleaf bat (Hipposideros doriae)
Khajuria's leaf-nosed bat (Hipposideros durgadasi)
Dayak roundleaf bat (Hipposideros dyacorum)
Hill's roundleaf bat (Hipposideros edwardshilli)
House-dwelling leaf-nosed bat (Hipposideros einnaythu)
Hipposideros fasensis
Sooty roundleaf bat (Hipposideros fuliginosus)
Fulvus roundleaf bat (Hipposideros fulvus)
Cantor's roundleaf bat (Hipposideros galeritus)
Grand roundleaf bat (Hipposideros grandis)
Griffin's leaf-nosed bat (Hipposideros griffini)
Thailand roundleaf bat (Hipposideros halophyllus)
Kolar leaf-nosed bat (Hipposideros hypophyllus)
Crested roundleaf bat (Hipposideros inexpectatus)
Arnhem leaf-nosed bat (Hipposideros inordinatus)
Jones's roundleaf bat (Hipposideros jonesi)
Phou Khao Khouay leaf-nosed bat (Hipposideros khaokhouayensis)
Khasian leaf-nosed bat (Hipposideros khasiana)
Lamotte's roundleaf bat (Hipposideros lamottei)
Indian roundleaf bat (Hipposideros lankadiva)
Intermediate roundleaf bat (Hipposideros larvatus)
Large Asian roundleaf bat (Hipposideros lekaguli)
Shield-faced roundleaf bat (Hipposideros lylei)
Big-eared roundleaf bat (Hipposideros macrobullatus)
Maduran leaf-nosed bat (Hipposideros madurae)
Maggie Taylor's roundleaf bat (Hipposideros maggietaylorae)
Aellen's roundleaf bat (Hipposideros marisae)
Ethiopian large-eared roundleaf bat (Hipposideros megalotis)
Fly River roundleaf bat (Hipposideros muscinus)
Malayan roundleaf bat (Hipposideros nequam)
Hipposideros nicobarulae
Philippine forest roundleaf bat (Hipposideros obscurus)
Orbiculus leaf-nosed bat (Hipposideros orbiculus)
Biak roundleaf bat (Hipposideros papua)
Hipposideros parnabyi
Peleng leaf-nosed bat (Hipposideros pelingensis)
Pendlebury's roundleaf bat (Hipposideros pendleburyi)
Pomona roundleaf bat (Hipposideros pomona)
Pratt's roundleaf bat (Hipposideros pratti)
Philippine pygmy roundleaf bat (Hipposideros pygmaeus)
Ridley's leaf-nosed bat (Hipposideros ridleyi)
Laotian leaf-nosed bat (Hipposideros rotalis)
Noack's roundleaf bat (Hipposideros ruber)
Shield-nosed leaf-nosed bat (Hipposideros scutinares)
Semon's roundleaf bat (Hipposideros semoni)
Sorensen's leaf-nosed bat (Hipposideros sorenseni)
Schneider's leaf-nosed bat (Hipposideros speoris)
Northern leaf-nosed bat (Hipposideros stenotis)
Sumba roundleaf bat (Hipposideros sumbae)
Hipposideros tephrus
Lesser great leaf-nosed bat (Hipposideros turpis)
Wollaston's roundleaf bat (Hipposideros wollastoni)
Genus Rhinonicteris
Orange leaf-nosed bat (Rhinonicteris aurantia)
Genus Macronycteris
Commerson's roundleaf bat (Macronycteris commersoni)
Giant roundleaf bat (Macronycteris gigas)
Saõ Tomé leaf-nosed bat (Macronycteris thomensis)
Striped leaf-nosed bat (Hipposideros vittatus)
Genus Paratriaenops
Grandidier's trident bat Paratriaenops auritus
Trouessart's trident bat (Paratriaenops furculus)
Paratriaenops pauliani
Genus Triaenops
African trident bat (Triaenops afer)
Triaenops menamena
Yemeni trident leaf-nosed bat (Triaenops parvus)
Rufous trident bat (Triaenops persicus)

Suborder Yangochiroptera

Superfamily Vespertilionoidea

Vespertilionidae

 
Vesper bats
Subfamily Murininae
Genus Harpiocephalus
Hairy-winged bat (Harpiocephalus harpia)
Genus Harpiola
Peter's tube-nosed bat (Harpiola grisea)
Taiwan tube-nosed bat (Harpiola isodon)
Genus Murina
Bronze tube-nosed bat (Murina aenea)
Annam tube-nosed bat (Murina annamitica)
Little tube-nosed bat (Murina aurata)
Bala tube-nosed bat (Murina balaensis)
Beelzebub's tube-nosed bat (Murina beelzebub)
Bicolored tube-nosed bat (Murina bicolor)
Murina chrysochaetes
Ashy-gray tube-nosed bat (Murina cineracea)
Round-eared tube-nosed bat (Murina cyclotis)
Elery's tube-nosed bat (Murina eleryi)
Murina fanjingshanensis
Murina feae
Fiona's tube-nosed bat (Murina fionae)
Flute-nosed bat (Murina florium)
Dusky tube-nosed bat (Murina fusca)
Slender tube-nosed bat (Murina gracilis)
Murina guilleni
Da Lat tube-nosed bat (Murina harpioloides)
Harrison's tube-nosed bat (Murina harrisoni)
Hilgendorf's tube-nosed bat (Murina hilgendorfi)
Hutton's tube-nosed bat (Murina huttoni)
Jaintia tube-nosed bat (Murina jaintiana)
Murina kontumensis
Greater tube-nosed bat (Murina leucogaster)
Murina loreliae
Murina peninsularis
Rainforest tube-nosed bat (Murina pluvialis)
Taiwan tube-nosed bat (Murina puta)
Murina recondita
Gilded tube-nosed bat (Murina rozendaali)
Ryukyu tube-nosed bat (Murina ryukyuana)
Murina shuipuensis
Brown tube-nosed bat (Murina suilla)
Gloomy tube-nosed bat (Murina tenebrosa)
Scully's tube-nosed bat (Murina tubinaris)
Ussuri tube-nosed bat (Murina ussuriensis)
Walston's tube-nosed bat (Murina walstoni)

Subfamily Myotinae
Genus Myotis
Sakhalin myotis (Myotis abei)
Large-footed bat (Myotis adversus)
Southern myotis (Myotis aelleni)
Silver-tipped myotis (Myotis albescens)
Alcathoe bat (Myotis alcathoe)
Szechwan myotis (Myotis altarium)
Anjouan myotis (Myotis anjouanensis)
Annamit myotis (Myotis annamiticus)
Hairy-faced bat (Myotis annectans)
Atacama myotis (Myotis atacamensis)
Peters's myotis (Myotis ater)
Southwestern myotis (Myotis auriculus)
Australian myotis (Myotis australis)
Southeastern myotis (Myotis austroriparius)
Bechstein's bat (Myotis bechsteini)
Lesser mouse-eared bat (Myotis blythii)
Rufous mouse-eared bat (Myotis bocagii)
Far Eastern myotis (Myotis bombinus)
Brandt's bat (Myotis brandti)
Bocharic myotis (Myotis bucharensis)
California myotis (Myotis californicus)
Long-fingered bat (Myotis capaccinii)
Chilean myotis (Myotis chiloensis)
Large myotis (Myotis chinensis)
Western small-footed myotis (Myotis ciliolabrum)
Guatemalan myotis (Myotis cobanensis)
Cryptic myotis (Myotis crypticus)
Csorba's mouse-eared bat (Myotis csorbai)
Pond bat (Myotis dasycneme)
Daubenton's bat (Myotis daubentoni)
David's myotis (Myotis davidii)
Dominican myotis (Myotis dominicensis)
Elegant myotis (Myotis elegans)
Geoffroy's bat (Myotis emarginatus)
Western long-eared myotis (Myotis evotis)
Fringed long-footed myotis (Myotis fimbriatus)
Findley's myotis (Myotis findleyi)
Hodgson's bat (Myotis formosus)
Cinnamon myotis (Myotis fortidens)
Fraternal myotis (Myotis frater)
Gomantong myotis (Myotis gomantongensis)
Malagasy mouse-eared bat (Myotis goudoti)
Gray bat (Myotis grisescens)
Armenian whiskered bat (Myotis hajastanicus)
Lesser large-footed bat (Myotis hasseltii)
Herman's myotis (Myotis hermani)
Horsfield's bat (Myotis horsfieldii)
Hosono's myotis (Myotis hosonoi)
Ikonnikov's bat (Myotis ikonnikovi)
Insular myotis (Myotis insularum)
Myotis izecksohni
Hairy-legged myotis (Myotis keaysi)
Keen's myotis (Myotis keenii)
Chinese water myotis (Myotis laniger)
Eastern small-footed myotis (Myotis leibii)
Yellowish myotis (Myotis levis)
Kashmir cave bat (Myotis longipes)
Little brown bat (Myotis lucifugus)
Big-footed myotis (Myotis macrodactylus)
Southern myotis (Myotis macropus)
Pallid large-footed myotis (Myotis macrotarsus)
Schwartz's myotis (Myotis martiniquensis)
Dark-nosed small-footed myotis (Myotis melanorhinus)
Maluku myotis (Myotis moluccarum)
Burmese whiskered bat (Myotis montivagus)
Morris's bat (Myotis morrisi)
Whiskered myotis (Myotis muricola)
Greater mouse-eared bat (Myotis myotis)
Whiskered bat (Myotis mystacinus)
Natterer's bat (Myotis nattereri)
Curacao myotis (Myotis nesopolus)
Black myotis (Myotis nigricans)
Nepal myotis (Myotis nipalensis)
Arizona myotis (Myotis occultus)
Singapore whiskered bat (Myotis oreias)
Montane myotis (Myotis oxyotus)
Honshu myotis (Myotis ozensis)
Peninsular myotis (Myotis peninsularis)
Peking myotis (Myotis pequinius)
Flat-headed myotis (Myotis planiceps)
Frosted myotis (Myotis pruinosus)
Felten's myotis (Myotis punicus)
Rickett's big-footed bat (Myotis ricketti)
Ridley's bat (Myotis ridleyi)
Riparian myotis (Myotis riparius)
Thick-thumbed myotis (Myotis rosseti)
Red myotis (Myotis ruber)
Schaub's myotis (Myotis schaubi)
Scott's mouse-eared bat (Myotis scotti)
Northern long-eared myotis (Myotis septentrionalis)
Mandelli's mouse-eared bat (Myotis sicarius)
Himalayan whiskered bat (Myotis siligorensis)
Velvety myotis (Myotis simus)
Indiana bat (Myotis sodalis)
Kei myotis (Myotis stalkeri)
Fringed myotis (Myotis thysanodes)
Cape hairy bat (Myotis tricolor)
Cave myotis (Myotis velifer)
Fish-eating bat (Myotis vivesi)
Long-legged myotis (Myotis volans)
Welwitsch's bat (Myotis welwitschii)
Yanbaru whiskered bat (Myotis yanbarensis)
Yoshiyuki's myotis (Myotis yesoensis)
Yuma myotis (Myotis yumanensis)
Zenati myotis (Myotis zenatius)
Genus Submyotodon
 Submyotodon caliginosus 
Submyotodon petersbuchensis
 Taiwan broad-muzzled myotis (Submyotodon latirostris) 
 Moupin broad-muzzled bat (Submyotodon moupinensis)
Subfamily Kerivoulinae
Genus Kerivoula
Tanzanian woolly bat (Kerivoula africana)
St. Aignan's trumpet-eared bat (Kerivoula agnella)
Damara woolly bat (Kerivoula argentata)
Copper woolly bat (Kerivoula cuprosa)
Ethiopian woolly bat (Kerivoula eriophora)
Flores woolly bat (Kerivoula flora)
Hardwicke's woolly bat (Kerivoula hardwickii)
Small woolly bat (Kerivoula intermedia)
Lesser woolly bat (Kerivoula lanosa)
Lenis woolly bat (Kerivoula lenis)
Least woolly bat (Kerivoula minuta)
Fly River trumpet-eared bat (Kerivoula muscina)
Bismarck's trumpet-eared bat (Kerivoula myrella)
Papillose woolly bat (Kerivoula papillosa)
Clear-winged woolly bat (Kerivoula pellucida)
Spurrell's woolly bat (Kerivoula phalaena)
Painted bat (Kerivoula picta)
Smith's woolly bat (Kerivoula smithii)
Whitehead's woolly bat (Kerivoula whiteheadi)
Subfamily Vespertilioninae
Genus Antrozous
Pallid bat (Antrozous pallidus)
Genus Arielulus
Collared pipistrelle (Arielulus aureocollaris)
Black-gilded pipistrelle (Arielulus circumdatus)
Coppery pipistrelle (Arielulus cuprosus)
Social pipistrelle (Arielulus societatis)
Necklace pipistrelle (Arielulus torquatus)
Genus Bauerus
Van Gelder's bat (Bauerus dubiaquercus)
Genus Baeodon
Allen's yellow bat (Baeodon alleni)
Genus Barbastella
Western barbastelle (Barbastella barbastellus)
Beijing barbastelle (Barbastella beijingensis)
Eastern barbastelle (Barbastella leucomelas)
Genus Chalinolobus
Large-eared pied bat (Chalinolobus dwyeri)
Gould's wattled bat (Chalinolobus gouldii)
Chocolate wattled bat (Chalinolobus morio)
New Caledonia wattled bat (Chalinolobus neocaledonicus)
Hoary wattled bat (Chalinolobus nigrogriseus)
Little pied bat (Chalinolobus picatus)
New Zealand long-tailed bat (Chalinolobus tuberculatus)
Genus Corynorhinus
Rafinesque's big-eared bat (Corynorhinus rafinesqii)
Mexican big-eared bat (Corynorhinus mexicanus)
Townsend's big-eared bat (Corynorhinus townsendii)
Genus Eptesicus
Little black serotine (Eptesicus andinus)
Bobrinski's serotine (Eptesicus bobrinskoi)
Botta's serotine (Eptesicus bottae)
Brazilian brown bat (Eptesicus brasiliensis)
Chiriquinan serotine (Eptesicus chiriquinus)
Diminutive serotine (Eptesicus diminutus)
Surat serotine (Eptesicus dimissus)
Horn-skinned bat (Eptesicus floweri)
Argentine brown bat (Eptesicus furinalis)
Big brown bat (Eptesicus fuscus)
Gobi big brown bat (Eptesicus gobiensis)
Guadeloupe big brown bat (Eptesicus guadeloupensis)
Long-tailed house bat (Eptesicus hottentotus)
Harmless serotine (Eptesicus innoxius)
Meridional serotine (Eptesicus isabellinus)
Japanese short-tailed bat (Eptesicus japonensis)
Kobayashi's bat (Eptesicus kobayashii)
Sind bat (Eptesicus nasutus)
Northern bat (Eptesicus nilssonii)
Thick-eared bat (Eptesicus pachyotis)
Lagos serotine (Eptesicus platyops)
Serotine bat (Eptesicus serotinus)
Taddei's serotine (Eptesicus taddeii)
Sombre bat (Eptesicus tatei)
Genus Euderma
Spotted bat (Euderma maculatum)
Genus Eudiscopus
Disk-footed bat (Eudiscopus denticulus)
Genus Falsistrellus
Chocolate pipistrelle (Falsistrellus affinis)
Western false pipistrelle (Falsistrellus mackenziei)
Pungent pipistrelle (Falsistrellus mordax)
Peters's pipistrelle (Falsistrellus petersi)
Eastern false pipistrelle (Falsistrellus tasmaniensis)
Genus Glauconycteris
Allen's striped bat (Glauconycteris alboguttata)
Silvered bat (Glauconycteris argentata)
Beatrix's bat (Glauconycteris beatrix)
Curry's bat (Glauconycteris curryae)
Bibundi bat (Glauconycteris egeria)
Glen's wattled bat (Glauconycteris gleni)
Allen's spotted bat (Glauconycteris humeralis)
Kenyan wattled bat (Glauconycteris kenyacola)
Machado's butterfly bat (Glauconycteris machadoi)
Abo bat (Glauconycteris poensis)
Butterfly bat (Glauconycteris variegata)
Genus Glischropus
Javan thick-thumbed bat (Glischropus javanus)
Common thick-thumbed bat (Glischropus tylopus)
Genus Hesperoptenus
Blanford's bat (Hesperoptenus blanfordi)
False serotine bat (Hesperoptenus doriae)
Gaskell's false serotine (Hesperoptenus gaskelli)
Tickell's bat (Hesperoptenus tickelli)
Large false serotine (Hesperoptenus tomesi)
Genus Histiotus
Strange big-eared brown bat (Histiotus alienus)
Humboldt big-eared brown bat (Histiotus humboldti)
Thomas's big-eared brown bat (Histiotus laephotis)
Big-eared brown bat (Histiotus macrotus)
Southern big-eared brown bat (Histiotus magellanicus)
Small big-eared brown bat (Histiotus montanus)
Tropical big-eared brown bat (Histiotus velatus)
Genus Hypsugo
Alashanian pipistrelle (Hypsugo alaschanicus)
Anchieta's pipistrelle (Hypsugo anchietae)
Anthony's pipistrelle (Hypsugo anthonyi)
Arabian pipistrelle (Hypsugo arabicus)
Desert pipistrelle (Hypsugo ariel)
Dark Madagascar pipistrelle (Hypsugo bemainty)
Cadorna's pipistrelle (Hypsugo cadornae)
Broad-headed pipistrelle (Hypsugo crassulus)
Long-toothed pipistrelle (Hypsugo dolichodon)
Eisentraut's pipistrelle (Hypsugo eisentrauti)
Brown pipistrelle (Hypsugo imbricatus)
Joffre's pipistrelle (Hypsugo joffrei)
Red-brown pipistrelle (Hypsugo kitcheneri)
Socotran pipistrelle (Hypsugo lanzai)  
Burma pipistrelle  (Hypsugo lophurus)
Big-eared pipistrelle  (Hypsugo macrotis)
Mouselike pipistrelle (Hypsugo musciculus)
Chinese pipistrelle (Hypsugo pulveratus)
Savi's pipistrelle (Hypsugo savii)
Vordermann's pipistrelle (Hypsugo vordermanni)
Genus Ia
Great evening bat (Ia io)
Genus Idionycteris
Allen's big-eared bat (Idionycteris phyllotis)
Genus Laephotis
Angolan long-eared bat (Laephotis angolensis)
Botswanan long-eared bat (Laephotis botswanae)
Namib long-eared bat (Laephotis namibensis)
De Winton's long-eared bat (Laephotis wintoni)
Genus Lasionycteris
Silver-haired bat (Lasionycteris noctivagans)
Genus Lasiurus
Greater red bat (Lasiurus atratus)
Desert red bat (Lasiurus blossevillii)
Eastern red bat (Lasiurus borealis)
Tacarcuna bat (Lasiurus castaneus)
Hoary bat (Lasiurus cinereus)
Hawaiian hoary bat (Lasiurus cinereus semotus)
Jamaican red bat (Lasiurus degelidus)
Hairy-tailed bat (Lasiurus ebenus)
Southern yellow bat (Lasiurus ega)
Big red bat (Lasiurus egregius)
Cuban yellow bat (Lasiurus insularis)
Northern yellow bat (Lasiurus intermedius)
Minor red bat (Lasiurus minor)
Pfeiffer's red bat (Lasiurus pfeifferi)
Saline red bat (Lasiurus salinae)
Seminole bat (Lasiurus seminolus)
Cinnamon red bat (Lasiurus varius)
Western yellow bat (Lasiurus xanthinus)
Genus Mimetillus
Moloney's mimic bat (Mimetillus moloneyi)
Genus Neoromicia
Dark-brown serotine (Neoromicia brunneus)
Cape serotine (Neoromicia capensis)
Yellow serotine (Neoromicia flavescens)
Tiny serotine (Neoromicia guineensis)
Heller's pipistrelle (Neoromicia helios)
Isalo serotine (Neoromicia malagasyensis)
Malagasy serotine (Neoromicia matroka)
Melck's house bat (Neoromicia melckorum)
Banana pipistrelle (Neoromicia nana)
Rendall's serotine (Neoromicia rendalli)
Rosevear's serotine (Neoromicia roseveari)
White-winged serotine (Neoromicia tenuipinnis)
Zulu serotine (Neoromicia zuluensis)
Genus Niumbaha
Pied bat (Niumbaha superba)
Genus Nyctalus
Birdlike noctule (Nyctalus aviator)
Azores noctule (Nyctalus azoreum)
Japanese noctule (Nyctalus furvus)
Greater noctule bat (Nyctalus lasiopterus)
Lesser noctule (Nyctalus leisleri)
Mountain noctule (Nyctalus montanus)
Common noctule (Nyctalus noctula)
Chinese noctule (Nyctalus plancyi)
Genus Nycticeinops
Schlieffen's twilight bat (Nycticeinops schlieffeni)
Genus Nycticeius
Temminck's mysterious bat (Nycticeius aenobarbus)
Cuban evening bat (Nycticeius cubanus)
Evening bat (Nycticeius humeralis)
Genus Nyctophilus
Northern long-eared bat (Nyctophilus arnhemensis)
Eastern long-eared bat (Nyctophilus bifax)
Southeastern long-eared bat (Nyctophilus corbeni)
Lesser long-eared bat (Nyctophilus geoffroyi)
Gould's long-eared bat (Nyctophilus gouldi)
Sunda long-eared bat (Nyctophilus heran)
Lord Howe long-eared bat (Nyctophilus howensis)
Western long-eared bat (Nyctophilus major)
Small-toothed long-eared bat (Nyctophilus microdon)
New Guinea long-eared bat (Nyctophilus microtis)
New Caledonian long-eared bat (Nyctophilus nebulosus)
Tasmanian long-eared bat (Nyctophilus sherrini)
Mt. Missim long-eared bat (Nyctophilus shirleyae)
Greater long-eared bat (Nyctophilus timoriensis)
Pygmy long-eared bat (Nyctophilus walkeri)
Genus Otonycteris
Desert long-eared bat (Otonycteris hemprichii)
Genus Parastrellus
Canyon bat (Parastrellus hesperus)
Genus Perimyotis
Tricolored bat (Perimyotis subflavus)
Genus Pharotis
New Guinea big-eared bat (Pharotis imogene)
Genus Philetor
Rohu's bat (Philetor brachypterus)
Genus Pipistrellus
Japanese pipistrelle (Pipistrellus abramus)
Forest pipistrelle (Pipistrellus adamsi)
Mount Gargues pipistrelle (Pipistrellus aero)
Angulate pipistrelle (Pipistrellus angulatus)
Kelaart's pipistrelle (Pipistrellus ceylonicus)
Greater Papuan pipistrelle (Pipistrellus collinus)
Indian pipistrelle (Pipistrellus  coromandra)
Egyptian pipistrelle (Pipistrellus deserti)
Endo's pipistrelle (Pipistrellus endoi)
Hanaki's dwarf bat (Pipistrellus hanaki)
Dusky pipistrelle (Pipistrellus hesperidus)
Aellen's pipistrelle (Pipistrellus inexspectatus)
Java pipistrelle (Pipistrellus javanicus)
Kuhl's pipistrelle (Pipistrellus kuhlii)
Madeira pipistrelle (Pipistrellus maderensis)
Minahassa pipistrelle (Pipistrellus minahassae)
Christmas Island pipistrelle (Pipistrellus murrayi)
Tiny pipistrelle (Pipistrellus nanulus)
Nathusius's pipistrelle (Pipistrellus nathusii)
Lesser Papuan pipistrelle (Pipistrellus papuanus)
Mount Popa pipistrelle (Pipistrellus paterculus)
Dar es Salaam pipistrelle (Pipistrellus permixtus)
Common pipistrelle (Pipistrellus pipistrellus)
Soprano pipistrelle (Pipistrellus pygmaeus)
Racey's pipistrelle (Pipistrellus raceyi)
Rüppell's pipistrelle (Pipistrellus rueppellii)
Rusty pipistrelle (Pipistrellus rusticus)
Narrow-winged pipistrelle (Pipistrellus stenopterus)
Sturdee's pipistrelle (Pipistrellus sturdeei)
Least pipistrelle (Pipistrellus tenuis)
Watts's pipistrelle (Pipistrellus wattsi)
Northern pipistrelle (Pipistrellus westralis)
Genus Plecotus
Plecotus ariel?
Brown long-eared bat (Plecotus auritus)
Grey long-eared bat (Plecotus austriacus)
Ethiopian big-eared bat (Plecotus balensis)
Christie's big-eared bat (Plecotus christii)
Mediterranean long-eared bat (Plecotus kolombatovici)
Alpine long-eared bat (Plecotus macrobullaris)
Japanese long-eared bat (Plecotus sacrimontis)
Sardinian long-eared bat (Plecotus sardus)
Taiwan big-eared bat (Plecotus taivanus)
Strelkov's big-eared bat (Plecotus strelkovi)
Canary big-eared bat (Plecotus teneriffae)
Genus Rhogeessa
Yucatan yellow bat (Rhogeessa aeneus)
Bickham's little yellow bat (Rhogeessa bickhami)
Genoways's yellow bat (Rhogeessa genowaysi)
Slender yellow bat (Rhogeessa gracilis)
Husson's yellow bat (Rhogeessa hussoni)
Thomas's yellow bat (Rhogeessa io)
Tiny yellow bat (Rhogeessa minutilla)
Least yellow bat (Rhogeessa mira)
Little yellow bat (Rhogeessa parvula)
Black-winged little yellow bat (Rhogeessa tumida)
Genus Scoteanax
Rüppell's broad-nosed bat (Scoteanax rueppellii)
Genus Scotoecus
White-bellied lesser house bat (Scotoecus albigula)
Light-winged lesser house bat (Scotoecus albofuscus)
Hinde's lesser house bat (Scotoecus hindei)
Dark-winged lesser house bat (Scotoecus hirundo)
Desert yellow bat (Scotoecus pallidus)
Genus Scotomanes
Harlequin bat (Scotomanes ornatus)
Genus Scotophilus
Andrew Rebori's house bat (Scotophilus andrewreborii)
Lesser yellow bat (Scotophilus borbonicus)
Sulawesi yellow bat (Scotophilus celebensis)
Sody's yellow house bat (Scotophilus collinus)
African yellow bat (Scotophilus dinganii)
Greater Asiatic yellow bat (Scotophilus heathi)
Lesser Asiatic yellow bat (Scotophilus kuhlii)
White-bellied yellow bat (Scotophilus leucogaster)
Schreber's yellow bat (Scotophilus nigrita)
Robbins's yellow bat (Scotophilus nucella)
Nut-colored yellow bat (Scotophilus nux)
Robust yellow bat (Scotophilus robustus)
Greenish yellow bat (Scotophilus viridis)
Genus Scotorepens
Inland broad-nosed bat (Scotorepens balstoni)
Little broad-nosed bat (Scotorepens greyii)
Eastern broad-nosed bat (Scotorepens orion)
Northern broad-nosed bat (Scotorepens sanborni)
Genus Scotozous
Dormer's bat (Scotozous dormeri)
Genus Tylonycteris
Lesser bamboo bat (Tylonycteris pachypus)
Greater bamboo bat (Tylonycteris robustula)
Genus Vespadelus
Inland forest bat (Vespadelus baverstocki)
Northern cave bat (Vespadelus caurinus)
Large forest bat (Vespadelus darlingtoni)
Yellow-lipped bat (Vespadelus douglasorum)
Finlayson's cave bat (Vespadelus finlaysoni)
Eastern forest bat (Vespadelus pumilus)
Southern forest bat (Vespadelus regulus)
Troughton's forest bat (Vespadelus troughtoni)
Little forest bat (Vespadelus vulturnus)
Genus Vespertilio
Parti-coloured bat (Vespertilio murinus)
Asian parti-coloured bat (Vespertilio sinensis)

Natalidae
funnel-eared bats
Genus Chilonatalus
Cuban funnel-eared bat (Chilonatalus micropus)
Bahaman funnel-eared bat (Chilonatalus tumidifrons)
Genus Natalus
Brazilian funnel-eared bat (Natalus espiritosantensis)
Jamaican greater funnel-eared bat (Natalus jamaicensis)
Hispaniolan greater funnel-eared bat (Natalus major)
Mexican greater funnel-eared bat (Natalus mexicanus)
Cuban greater funnel-eared bat (Natalus primus)
Mexican funnel-eared bat (Natalus stramineus)
Trinidadian funnel-eared bat (Natalus tumidirostris)
Genus Nyctiellus
Gervais's funnel-eared bat (Nyctiellus lepidus)

Cistugidae
Genus Cistugo
Lesueur's hairy bat (Cistugo lesueuri)
Angolan hairy bat (Cistugo seabrai)

Miniopteridae
Genus Miniopterus
Miniopterus aelleni
Montagne d’Ambre long-fingered bat (Miniopterus ambohitrensis)
African long-fingered bat (Miniopterus africanus)
Little bent-wing bat (Miniopterus australis)
Miniopterus brachytragos
Eger's long-fingered bat (Miniopterus egeri)
Lesser long-fingered bat (Miniopterus fraterculus)
Southeast Asian long-fingered bat (Miniopterus fuscus)
Glen's long-fingered bat (Miniopterus gleni)
Griffith's long-fingered bat (Miniopterus griffithsi)
Miniopterus griveaudi
Greater long-fingered bat (Miniopterus inflatus)
Miniopterus macrocneme
Maghrebian bent-wing bat (Miniopterus maghrebensis)
Western bent-winged bat (Miniopterus magnater)
Miniopterus mahafaliensis
Major's long-fingered bat (Miniopterus majori)
Manavi long-fingered bat (Miniopterus manavi)
Intermediate long-fingered bat (Miniopterus medius)
Least long-fingered bat (Miniopterus minor)
Natal long-fingered bat (Miniopterus natalensis)
Miniopterus newtoni
Philippine long-fingered bat (Minopterus paululus)
Peterson's long-fingered bat (Miniopterus petersoni)
Small bent-winged bat (Miniopterus pusillus)
Loyalty bent-winged bat (Miniopterus robustior)
Common bent-wing bat (Miniopterus schreibersii)
Shortridge's long-fingered bat (Miniopterus shortridgei)
Miniopterus sororculus
Great bent-winged bat (Miniopterus tristis)

Molossidae

 
free-tailed bats
Subfamily Molossinae
Genus Chaerephon
Duke of Abruzzi's free-tailed bat (Chaerephon aloysiisabaudiae)
Ansorge's free-tailed bat (Chaerephon ansorgei)
Chaerephon atsinanana
Gland-tailed free-tailed bat (Chaerephon bemmeleni)
Spotted free-tailed bat (Chaerephon bivittatus)
Fijian mastiff bat (Chaerephon bregullae)
Chapin's free-tailed bat (Chaerephon chapini)
Gallagher's free-tailed bat (Chaerephon gallagheri)
Northern freetail bat (Chaerephon jobensis)
Black and red free-tailed bat (Chaerephon jobimena)
Northern free-tailed bat (Chaerephon johorensis)
Lappet-eared free-tailed bat (Chaerephon major)
Nigerian free-tailed bat (Chaerephon nigeriae)
Wrinkle-lipped free-tailed bat (Chaerephon plicatus)
Little free-tailed bat (Chaerephon pumilus)
Russet free-tailed bat (Chaerephon russatus)
Solomons mastiff bat (Chaerephon solomonis)
São Tomé free-tailed bat (Chaerephon tomensis)
Genus Cheiromeles
Lesser naked bat (Cheiromeles parvidens)
Hairless bat (Cheiromeles torquatus)
Genus Cynomops
Cinnamon dog-faced bat (Cynomops abrasus)
Greenhall's dog-faced bat (Cynomops greenhalli)
Mexican dog-faced bat (Cynomops mexicanus)
Cynomops milleri
Para dog-faced bat (Cynomops paranus)
Southern dog-faced bat (Cynomops planirostris)
Genus Eumops
Black bonneted bat (Eumops auripendulus)
Dwarf bonneted bat (Eumops bonariensis)
Big bonneted bat (Eumops dabbenei)
Eumops delticus
Florida bonneted bat (Eumops floridanus)
Wagner's bonneted bat (Eumops glaucinus)
Sanborn's bonneted bat (Eumops hansae)
Guianan bonneted bat (Eumops maurus)
Eumops nanus
Patagonian bonneted bat (Eumops patagonicus)
Western mastiff bat (Eumops perotis)
Colombian bonneted bat (Eumops trumbulli)
Underwood's bonneted bat (Eumops underwoodi)
Genus Molossops
Equatorial dog-faced bat (Molossops aequatorianus)
Mato Grosso dog-faced bat (Molossops mattogrossensis)
Rufous dog-faced bat (Molossops neglectus)
Dwarf dog-faced bat (Molossops temminckii)
Genus Molossus
Alvarez's mastiff bat (Molossus alvarezi)
Aztec mastiff bat (Molossus aztecus)
Barnes' mastiff bat (Molossus barnesi)
Molossus bondae?
Coiban mastiff bat (Molossus coibensis)
Bonda mastiff bat (Molossus currentium)
Velvety free-tailed bat (Molossus molossus)
Miller's mastiff bat (Molossus pretiosus)
Black mastiff bat (Molossus rufus)
Sinaloan mastiff bat (Molossus sinaloae)
Genus Mops
Mops bakarii
Sierra Leone free-tailed bat (Mops brachyptera)
Angolan free-tailed bat (Mops condylurus)
Medje free-tailed bat (Mops congicus)
Mongalla free-tailed bat (Mops demonstrator)
Malagasy white-bellied free-tailed bat (Mops leucostigma)
Midas free-tailed bat (Mops midas)
Malayan free-tailed bat (Mops mops)
Dwarf free-tailed bat (Mops nanulus)
Niangara free-tailed bat (Mops niangarae)
White-bellied free-tailed bat (Mops niveiventer)
Peterson's free-tailed bat (Mops petersoni)
Sulawesi free-tailed bat (Mops sarasinorum)
Spurrell's free-tailed bat (Mops spurrelli)
Railer bat (Mops thersites)
Trevor's free-tailed bat (Mops trevori)
Genus Mormopterus
Natal free-tailed bat (Mormopterus acetabulosus)
Beccari's mastiff bat (Mormopterus beccarii)
Mormopterus cobourgianus
Sumatran mastiff bat (Mormopterus doriae)
Bristle-faced free-tailed bat (Mormopterus eleryi)
Mormopterus francoismoutoui
Cape York free-tailed bat (Mormopterus halli)
Peter's wrinkle-lipped bat (Mormopterus jugularis)
Kalinowski's mastiff bat (Mormopterus kalinowskii)
South-western free-tailed bat (Mormopterus kitcheneri)
Loria's mastiff bat (Mormopterus loriae)
Mormopterus lumsdenae
Little goblin bat (Mormopterus minutus)
East-coast free-tailed bat (Mormopterus norfolkensis)
Inland free-tailed bat (Mormopterus petersi)
Incan little mastiff bat (Mormopterus phrudus)
Southern free-tailed bat (Mormopterus planiceps)
Mormopterus ridei
Genus Myopterus
Daubenton's free-tailed bat (Myopterus daubentonii)
Bini free-tailed bat (Myopterus whitleyi)
Genus Nyctinomops
Peale's free-tailed bat (Nyctinomops aurispinosus)
Pocketed free-tailed bat (Nyctinomops femorosaccus)
Broad-eared bat (Nyctinomops laticaudatus)
Big free-tailed bat (Nyctinomops macrotis)
Genus Otomops
Javan mastiff bat (Otomops formosus)
Harrison's large-eared giant mastiff bat (Otomops harrisoni)
Johnstone's mastiff bat (Otomops johnstonei)
Madagascar free-tailed bat (Otomops madagascariensis)
Large-eared free-tailed bat (Otomops martiensseni)
Big-eared mastiff bat (Otomops papuensis)
Mantled mastiff bat (Otomops secundus)
Wroughton's free-tailed bat (Otomops wroughtoni)
Genus Platymops
Peters's flat-headed bat (Platymops setiger)
Genus Promops
Big crested mastiff bat (Promops centralis)
Promops davisoni
Brown mastiff bat (Promops nasutus)
Genus Sauromys
Roberts's flat-headed bat (Sauromys petrophilus)
Genus Tadarida
Egyptian free-tailed bat (Tadarida aegyptiaca)
White-striped free-tailed bat (Tadarida australis)
Mexican free-tailed bat (Tadarida brasiliensis)
Madagascan large free-tailed bat (Tadarida fulminans)
East Asian free-tailed bat (Tadarida insignis)
New Guinea free-tailed bat (Tadarida kuboriensis)
La Touche's free-tailed bat (Tadarida latouchei)
Kenyan big-eared free-tailed bat (Tadarida lobata)
European free-tailed bat (Tadarida teniotis)
African giant free-tailed bat (Tadarida ventralis)
Subfamily Tomopeatinae
Genus Tomopeas
Blunt-eared bat (Tomopeas ravus)

Superfamily Emballonuroidea

Emballonuridae

sac-winged bats
Subfamily Emballonurinae
Genus Balantiopteryx
Ecuadorian sac-winged bat (Balantiopteryx infusca)
Thomas's sac-winged bat (Balantiopteryx io)
Gray sac-winged bat (Balantiopteryx plicata)
Genus Centronycteris
Thomas's shaggy bat (Centronycteris centralis)
Shaggy bat (Centronycteris maximiliani)
Genus Coleura
African sheath-tailed bat (Coleura afra)
Madagascar sheath-tailed bat (Coleura kibomalandy)
Seychelles sheath-tailed bat (Coleura seychellensis)
Genus Cormura
Chestnut sac-winged bat (Cormura brevirostris)
Genus Cyttarops
Short-eared bat (Cyttarops alecto)
Genus Diclidurus
Northern ghost bat (Diclidurus albus)
Greater ghost bat (Diclidurus ingens)
Isabelle's ghost bat (Diclidurus isabella)
Lesser ghost bat (Diclidurus scutatus)
Genus Emballonura
Small Asian sheath-tailed bat (Emballonura alecto)
Beccari's sheath-tailed bat (Emballonura beccarii)
Large-eared sheath-tailed bat (Emballonura dianae)
Greater sheath-tailed bat (Emballonura furax)
Lesser sheath-tailed bat (Emballonura monticola)
Raffray's sheath-tailed bat (Emballonura raffrayana)
Pacific sheath-tailed bat (Emballonura semicaudata)
Seri's sheath-tailed bat (Emballonura serii)
Genus Mosia
Dark sheath-tailed bat (Mosia nigrescens)
Genus Paremballonura
Peters's sheath-tailed bat (Paremballonura atrata)
Western sheath-tailed bat (Paremballonura tiavato)
Genus Peropteryx
Greater dog-like bat (Peropteryx kappleri)
White-winged dog-like bat (Peropteryx leucoptera)
Lesser dog-like bat (Peropteryx macrotis)
Pale-winged dog-like bat (Peropteryx pallidoptera)
Trinidad dog-like bat (Peropteryx trinitatis)
Genus Rhynchonycteris
Proboscis bat (Rhynchonycteris naso)
Genus Saccopteryx
Antioquian sac-winged bat (Saccopteryx antioquensis)
Greater sac-winged bat (Saccopteryx bilineata)
Frosted sac-winged bat (Saccopteryx canescens)
Amazonian sac-winged bat (Saccopteryx gymnura)
Lesser sac-winged bat (Saccopteryx leptura)
Subfamily Taphozoinae
Genus Saccolaimus
Yellow-bellied pouched bat (Saccolaimus flaviventris)
Troughton's pouched bat (Saccolaimus mixtus)
Pel's pouched bat (Saccolaimus peli)
Naked-rumped pouched bat (Saccolaimus saccolaimus)
Genus Taphozous
Indonesian tomb bat (Taphozous achates)
Coastal sheath-tailed bat (Taphozous australis)
Common sheath-tailed bat (Taphozous georgianus)
Hamilton's tomb bat (Taphozous hamiltoni)
Hildegarde's tomb bat (Taphozous hildegardeae)
Hill's sheath-tailed bat (Taphozous hilli)
Arnhem sheath-tailed bat (Taphozous kapalgensis)
Long-winged tomb bat (Taphozous longimanus)
Mauritian tomb bat (Taphozous mauritianus)
Black-bearded tomb bat (Taphozous melanopogon)
Naked-rumped tomb bat (Taphozous nudiventris)
Egyptian tomb bat (Taphozous perforatus)
Theobald's tomb bat (Taphozous theobaldi)
Troughton's sheath-tailed bat (Taphozous troughtoni)

Nycteridae
hollow-faced bats and slit-faced bats
Genus Nycteris
Bate's slit-faced bat (Nycteris arge)
Andersen's slit-faced bat (Nycteris aurita)
Gambian slit-faced bat (Nycteris gambiensis)
Large slit-faced bat (Nycteris grandis)
Hairy slit-faced bat (Nycteris hispida)	
Intermediate slit-faced bat (Nycteris intermedia)
Javan slit-faced bat (Nycteris javanica)
Large-eared slit-faced bat (Nycteris macrotis)
Malagasy slit-faced bat (Nycteris madagascariensis)
Ja slit-faced bat (Nycteris major)	
Dwarf slit-faced bat (Nycteris nana)
Parissi's slit-faced bat (Nycteris parisii)
Egyptian slit-faced bat (Nycteris thebaica)
Malayan slit-faced bat (Nycteris tragata)
Vinson's slit-faced bat (Nycteris vinsoni)
Wood's slit-faced bat (Nycteris woodi)

Superfamily Noctilionoidea

Noctilionidae 
Bulldog bats
Genus Noctilio
 Greater bulldog bat (Noctilio leporinus)
 Lesser bulldog bat (Noctilio albiventris)

Mystacinidae 
New Zealand short-tailed bats
Genus Mystacina
New Zealand greater short-tailed bat (Mystacina robusta)
New Zealand lesser short-tailed bat (Mystacina tuberculata)

Mormoopidae 

ghost-faced bats and moustached/mustached bats
Genus Mormoops
Antillean ghost-faced bat (Mormoops blainvillii)
Giant ghost-faced bat (Mormoops magna)
Ghost-faced bat (Mormoops megalophylla)
Genus Pteronotus
Davy's naked-backed bat (Pteronotus davy)
Big naked-backed bat (Pteronotus gymnonotus)
Macleay's mustached bat (Pteronotus macleayi)
Pteronotus mesoamericanus
Paraguana moustached bat (Pteronotus paraguanensis)
Parnell's mustached bat (Pteronotus parnellii)
Wagner's mustached bat (Pteronotus personatus)
Sooty mustached bat (Pteronotus quadridens)
Pteronotus rubiginosus

Phyllostomidae 

leaf-nosed bats
Subfamily Brachyphyllinae
Genus Brachyphylla
Antillean fruit-eating bat (Brachyphylla cavernarum)
Cuban fruit-eating bat (Brachyphylla nana)
Subfamily Carolliinae
Genus Carollia
Benkeith's short-tailed bat (Carollia benkeithi)
Silky short-tailed bat (Carollia brevicauda)
Chestnut short-tailed bat (Carollia castanea)
Silky short-tailed bat (Carollia colombiana)
Manu short-tailed bat (Carollia manu)
Mono's short-tailed bat (Carollia monohernandezi)
Seba's short-tailed bat (Carollia perspicillata)
Sowell's short-tailed bat (Carollia sowelli)
Gray short-tailed bat (Carollia subrufa)
Genus Rhinophylla
Hairy little fruit bat (Rhinophylla alethina)
Fischer's little fruit bat (Rhinophylla fischerae)
Dwarf little fruit bat (Rhinophylla pumilio)
Subfamily Desmodontinae
Genus Desmodus
Common vampire bat (Desmodus rotundus)
Genus Diaemus
White-winged vampire bat (Diaemus youngi)
Genus Diphylla
Hairy-legged vampire bat (Diphylla ecaudata)
Subfamily Glossophaginae
Genus Anoura
Cadena's tailless bat (Anoura cadenai)
Tailed tailless bat (Anoura caudifer)
Handley's tailless bat (Anoura cultrata))
Tube-lipped nectar bat (Anoura fistulata)
Geoffroy's tailless bat (Anoura geoffroyi)
Broad-toothed tailless bat (Anoura latidens)
Genus Choeroniscus
Godman's long-tailed bat (Choeroniscus godmani)
Intermediate long-tailed bat (Choeroniscus intermedius)
Greater long-tailed bat (Choeroniscus periosus)
Minor long-nosed long-tongued bat (Choeroniscus minor)
Genus Choeronycteris
Mexican long-tongued bat (Choeronycteris mexicana)
Genus Glossophaga
Commissaris's long-tongued bat (Glossophaga commissarisi)
Miller's long-tongued bat (Glossophaga longirostris)
Pallas's long-tongued bat (Glossophaga soricina)
Genus Hylonycteris
Underwood's long-tongued bat (Hylonycteris underwoodi)
Genus Leptonycteris
Southern long-nosed bat (Leptonycteris curasoae)
Greater long-nosed bat (Leptonycteris nivalis)
Lesser long-nosed bat (Leptonycteris yerbabuenae)
Genus Lichonycteris
Dark long-tongued bat (Lichonycteris obscura)
Genus Monophyllus
Insular single leaf bat (Monophyllus plethodon)
Leach's single leaf bat (Monophyllus redmani)
Genus Musonycteris
Banana bat (Musonycteris harrisoni)
Genus Scleronycteris
Ega long-tongued bat (Scleronycteris ega)
Subfamily Lonchophyllinae
Genus Lionycteris
Chestnut long-tongued bat (Lionycteris spurrelli)
Genus Lonchophylla
Bokermann's nectar bat (Lonchophylla bokermanni)
Cadena's long-tongued bat (Lonchophylla cadenai)
Dekeyser's nectar bat (Lonchophylla dekeyseri)
Handley's nectar bat (Lonchophylla handleyi)
Western nectar bat (Lonchophylla hesperia)
Goldman's nectar bat (Lonchophylla mordax)
Orcés's long-tongued bat (Lonchophylla orcesi)
Lonchophylla orienticollina
Patton's long-tongued bat (Lonchophylla pattoni)
Orange nectar bat (Lonchophylla robusta)
Thomas's nectar bat (Lonchophylla thomasi)
Genus Platalina
Long-snouted bat (Platalina genovensium)
Subfamily Phyllostominae
Genus Chrotopterus
Big-eared woolly bat (Chrotopterus auritus)
Genus Lonchorhina
Tomes's sword-nosed bat (Lonchorhina aurita)
Northern sword-nosed bat (Lonchorhina inusitata)
Marinkelle's sword-nosed bat (Lonchorhina marinkellei)
Genus Lophostoma
Pygmy round-eared bat (Lophostoma brasiliense)
Carriker's round-eared bat (Lophostoma carrikeri)
Davis's round-eared bat (Lophostoma evotis)
Kalko's round-eared bat (Lophostoma kalkoae)
Western round-eared bat (Lophostoma occidentalis)
Schultz's round-eared bat (Lophostoma schulzi)
White-throated round-eared bat (Lophostoma silvicolum)
Yasuni round-eared bat (Lophostoma yasuni)
Genus Macrophyllum
Long-legged bat (Macrophyllum macrophyllum)
Genus Macrotus
California leaf-nosed bat (Macrotus californicus)
Waterhouse's leaf-nosed bat (Macrotus waterhousii)
Genus Micronycteris
Behn's bat (Micronycteris behnii)
Brosset's big-eared bat (Micronycteris brosseti)
Micronycteris giovanniae
Hairy big-eared bat (Micronycteris hirsuta)
White-bellied big-eared bat (Micronycteris homezi)
Matses' big-eared bat (Micronycteris matses)
Little big-eared bat (Micronycteris megalotis)
Common big-eared bat (Micronycteris microtis)
White-bellied big-eared bat (Micronycteris minuta)
Sanborn's big-eared bat (Micronycteris sanborni)
Schmidts's big-eared bat (Micronycteris schmidtorum)
Yates's big-eared bat (Micronycteris yatesi)
Genus Mimon
Golden bat (Mimon bennettii)
Cozumelan golden bat (Mimon cozumelae)
Striped hairy-nosed bat (Mimon crenulatum)
Koepcke's hairy-nosed bat (Mimon koepckeae)
Genus Phylloderma
Pale-faced bat (Phylloderma stenops)
Genus Phyllostomus
Pale spear-nosed bat (Phyllostomus discolor)
Lesser spear-nosed bat (Phyllostomus elongatus)
Greater spear-nosed bat (Phyllostomus hastatus)
Guianan spear-nosed bat (Phyllostomus latifolius)
Genus Tonatia
Greater round-eared bat (Tonatia bidens)
Stripe-headed round-eared bat (Tonatia saurophila)
Genus Trachops
Fringe-lipped bat (Trachops cirrhosus)
Genus Vampyrum
Spectral bat (Vampyrum spectrum)
Subfamily Phyllonycterinae
Genus Erophylla
Buffy flower bat (Erophylla sezekorni)
Genus Phyllonycteris
Jamaican flower bat (Phyllonycteris aphylla)
Puerto Rican flower bat (Phyllonycteris major)
Cuban flower bat (Phyllonycteris poeyi)
Subfamily Stenodermatinae
Genus Ametrida
Little white-shouldered bat (Ametrida centurio)
Genus Ardops
Tree bat (Ardops nichollsi)
Genus Ariteus
Jamaican fig-eating bat (Ariteus flavescens)
Genus Artibeus
Large fruit-eating bat (Artibeus amplus)
Brown fruit-eating bat (Artibeus concolor)
Fringed fruit-eating bat (Artibeus fimbriatus)
Fraternal fruit-eating bat (Artibeus fraterculus)
Hairy fruit-eating bat (Artibeus hirsutus)
Honduran fruit-eating bat (Artibeus inopinatus)
Jamaican fruit bat (Artibeus jamaicensis)
Great fruit-eating bat (Artibeus lituratus)
Dark fruit-eating bat (Artibeus obscurus)
Genus Centurio (wrinkle-faced bat; monotypic)
Wrinkle-faced bat (Centurio senex)
Genus Chiroderma
Brazilian big-eyed bat (Chiroderma doriae)
Guadeloupe big-eyed bat (Chiroderma improvisum)
Salvin's big-eyed bat (Chiroderma salvini)
Little big-eyed bat (Chiroderma trinitatum)
Hairy big-eyed bat (Chiroderma villosum)
Chiroderma vizottoi
Genus Dermanura
Andersen's fruit-eating bat (Dermanura anderseni)
Aztec fruit-eating bat (Dermanura azteca)
Bogota fruit-eating bat (Dermanura bogotensis)
Gervais's fruit-eating bat (Dermanura cinerea)
Silver fruit-eating bat (Dermanura glauca)
Gnome fruit-eating bat (Dermanura gnoma)
Pygmy fruit-eating bat (Dermanura phaeotis)
Dermanura rava
Rosenberg's fruit-eating bat (Dermanura rosenbergi)
Toltec fruit-eating bat (Dermanura tolteca)
Thomas's fruit-eating bat (Dermanura watsoni)
Genus Ectophylla
Honduran white bat (Ectophylla alba)
Genus Mesophylla
MacConnell's bat (Mesophylla macconnelli)
Genus Phyllops
Cuban fig-eating bat (Phyllops falcatus)
Genus Pygoderma
Ipanema bat (Pygoderma bilabiatum)
Genus Sphaeronycteris
Visored bat (Sphaeronycteris toxophyllum)
Genus Stenoderma
Red fruit bat (Stenoderma rufum)
Genus Sturnira
Aratathomas's yellow-shouldered bat (Sturnira aratathomasi)
Bidentate yellow-shouldered bat (Sturnira bidens)
Bogota yellow-shouldered bat (Sturnira bogotensis)
Burton's yellow-shouldered bat (Sturnira burtonlimi)
Hairy yellow-shouldered bat (Sturnira erythromos)
Sturnira koopmanhilli
Little yellow-shouldered bat (Sturnira lilium)
Highland yellow-shouldered bat (Sturnira ludovici)
Louis's yellow-shouldered bat (Sturnira luisi)
Greater yellow-shouldered bat (Sturnira magna)
Talamancan yellow-shouldered bat (Sturnira mordax)
Lesser yellow-shouldered bat (Sturnira nana)
Soriano's yellow-shouldered bat (Sturnira sorianoi)
Thomas's yellow-shouldered bat (Sturnira thomasi)
Tilda's yellow-shouldered bat (Sturnira tildae)
Genus Uroderma
Tent-making bat (Uroderma bilobatum)
Brown tent-making bat (Uroderma magnirostrum)
Genus Vampyressa
Bidentate yellow-eared bat (Vampyressa bidens)
Brock's yellow-eared bat (Vampyressa brocki)
Melissa's yellow-eared bat (Vampyressa melissa)
Vampyressa nymphaea
Southern little yellow-eared bat (Vampyressa pusilla)
Northern little yellow-eared bat (Vampyressa thyone)
Genus Vampyrodes
Great stripe-faced bat (Vampyrodes caraccioli)
Genus Platyrrhinus
Platyrrhinus albericoi
Eldorado broad-nosed bat (Platyrrhinus aurarius)
Short-headed broad-nosed bat (Platyrrhinus brachycephalus)
Choco broad-nosed bat (Platyrrhinus chocoensis)
Thomas's broad-nosed bat (Platyrrhinus dorsalis)
Heller's broad-nosed bat (Platyrrhinus helleri)
Buffy broad-nosed bat (Platyrrhinus infuscus)
Platyrrhinus ismaeli
White-lined broad-nosed bat (Platyrrhinus lineatus)
Quechua broad-nosed bat (Platyrrhinus masu)
Matapalo broad-nosed bat (Platyrrhinus matapalensis)
Platyrrhinus nigellus
Recife broad-nosed bat (Platyrrhinus recifinus)
Shadowy broad-nosed bat (Platyrrhinus umbratus)
Greater broad-nosed bat (Platyrrhinus vittatus)

Furipteridae 

Genus Amorphochilus
Smoky bat (Amorphochilus schnablii)
Genus Furipterus
Thumbless bat (Furipterus horrens)

Thyropteridae 

disk-winged bats
Genus Thyroptera
De Vivo's disk-winged bat (Thyroptera devivoi)
Peter's disk-winged bat (Thyroptera discifera)
LaVal's disk-winged bat (Thyroptera lavali)
Spix's disk-winged bat (Thyroptera tricolor)
Patricia's disk-winged bat (Thyroptera wynneae)

Myzopodidae 
sucker-footed bats
Genus Myzopoda
Madagascar sucker-footed bat (Myzopoda aurita)
Western sucker-footed bat (Myzopoda schliemanni)

See also
Mammal classification
List of fruit bats
List of horseshoe bats
List of bats by location
 List of bats of Australia
 List of bats of Borneo
 List of bats of the Caribbean by island
 List of bats of Canada
 List of bats of Madagascar

References

Bats
Bats